ArtScience Museum is a museum within the integrated resort of Marina Bay Sands in the Downtown Core of the Central Area in Singapore. Opened on 17 February 2011 by Singapore's Prime Minister Lee Hsien Loong, it is the world's first ArtScience museum, featuring major exhibitions that blend art, science, culture and technology.

Although a permanent exhibition at the ArtScience Gallery has been planned, the Museum mainly hosts touring exhibitions curated by other museums.

Architecture

The architecture is said to be a form reminiscent of a lotus flower. It is designed by Moshe Safdie.

Referred to as "The Welcoming Hand of Singapore" by Las Vegas Sands chairman Sheldon Adelson, the ArtScience Museum is anchored by a round base in the middle, with ten extensions referred to as "fingers". The design concept for each finger denotes various gallery spaces sporting skylights at the "fingertips", which are included as sustainable illumination for the curved interior walls.

Gallery spaces
The ArtScience Museum has 21 gallery spaces with a total area of 64,583 square feet (6,000 square meters).

Sustainability features
Rainwater is harvested and channelled down the centre of the building, flowing through its bowl-shaped roof into a reflecting pond at the lowest level of the building. The rainwater is then recycled for use in the building's restrooms.

Exhibitions

Permanent exhibition
Since Future World there is no permanent exhibition.

Touring exhibitions
Some of the touring exhibitions at the ArtScience Museum include:

Feature exhibitions

The ArtScience Museum features gallery spaces totalling 50,000 square feet (6,000 square meters) for exhibits from combined art/science, media/technology, as well as design/architecture motifs.

Permanent exhibits include objects indicative of the accomplishments of both the arts and the sciences through the ages, along the lines of Leonardo da Vinci's Flying Machine, a Kongming Lantern, and a high-tech robotic fish. The museum opened with an exhibition of a collection of the Belitung shipwreck cargo, and Tang dynasty treasures that were discovered and preserved by Tilman Walterfang of Seabed Explorations NZ Ltd.

Belitung shipwreck treasure
Tilman Walterfang and his team found the Tang dynasty artifacts in the Gaspar Strait in 1998 among the Belitung shipwreck, a large 9th-century Arabian dhow that sunk around 830 AD. For the next six years, they were desalinated, conserved and researched by his company Seabed Explorations Ltd in New Zealand.  They were eventually purchased for around 32 million USD.

An accurate reproduction of the Arab dhow ship, named The Jewel of Muscat, was presented by the Sultanate of Oman to the government and people of Singapore.

The items in the collection on tour accurately reflects the assortment and magnitude of the find and its global inter-cultural significance; this is the single largest consignment of Tang Dynasty export goods ever discovered. The find includes some of the oldest cobalt-blue-and-white ceramics made in China, several gold items made with Arabic designs and swastikas, jars filled with spices and incense resins, bronze mirrors, thousands of glazed bowls, ewers and other fine ceramics, as well as lead ingots. The pièce de résistance of the exhibition is a small cache of magnificent, intricately tooled vessels of silver and gold, which remain unparalleled in quality and design from the period.

World tour of Tang Dynasty shipwreck treasure
With support from the estate of Tan Sri Khoo Teck Puat, the cargo of the Arab dhow, which was used as the true and original model, is now generally referred to among academic circles as the "Tang Shipwreck Treasure: Singapore's Maritime Collection".

See also
 Maritime Experiential Museum and Aquarium
 Architecture of Singapore

References

External links

 ArtScience Museum website
 Harry Potter: The Exhibition website
 Seabed Explorations website
 Tilman Walterfang Manifesto
 FORBES's Story and some pictures of other treasures
 Photographs at Polynesian Navigators Association
 Story about ship's discovery, The Independent

Museums established in 2011
Science museums in Singapore
Art museums and galleries in Singapore
2011 establishments in Singapore